The economy of Tunisia is in the process of being liberalized after decades of heavy state direction and participation in the country's economy. Prudent economic and fiscal planning has resulted in moderate but sustained growth for over a decade. Tunisia's economic growth historically has depended on oil, phosphates, agri-food products, car parts manufacturing, and tourism.  In the World Economic Forum Global Competitiveness Report for 2015–2016, Tunisia ranks in 92nd place. Based on HDI latest report (for 2014), Tunisia ranks 96th globally and 5th in Africa.

The year 2015 was marked by terrorist attacks in Tunisia which are likely to affect economic growth, especially in tourism, one of the main sectors.

Historical trend
GDP per capita soared by more than 380% in the seventies (1970–1980: USD 280–1,369). But this proved unsustainable and it collapsed to a cumulative 10% growth in the turbulent eighties (1980–1990: USD 1,369–1,507), rising again to almost 50% cumulative growth in the nineties (1990–2000: USD 1,507–2,245), signifying the impact of successful diversification.

 Growing foreign debt and the foreign exchange crisis in the mid-1980s led the government to launch a structural adjustment program to liberalize prices, reduce tariffs, and reorient Tunisia toward a market economy in 1986. Tunisia's economic reform program was lauded as a model by international financial institutions. The government liberalized prices, reduced tariffs, lowered debt-service-to-exports and debt-to-GDP ratios, and extended the average maturity of its $10 billion foreign debt. Structural adjustment brought additional lending from the World Bank and other Western creditors. In 1990, Tunisia acceded to the General Agreement on Tariffs and Trade (GATT) and is a member of the World Trade Organization (WTO).

In 1996 Tunisia entered into an "Association Agreement" with the European Union (EU) which removed tariffs and other trade barriers on most goods by 2008. In conjunction with the Association Agreement, the EU is assisting the Tunisian government's Mise A Niveau (upgrading) program to enhance the productivity of Tunisian businesses and prepare for competition in the global marketplace.

The government totally or partially privatized around 160 state-owned enterprises after the privatization program was launched in 1987. Although the program is supported by the GATT, the government had to move carefully to avoid mass firings. Unemployment continued to plague Tunisia's economy and was aggravated by a rapidly growing workforce. An estimated 55% of the population is under the age of 25. Officially, 15.2% of the Tunisian workforce is unemployed.

In 2011, after the Arab Spring, the economy slumped but then recovered with 2.81% GDP growth in 2014. However, unemployment is still one of the major issues with 15.2% of the labor force unemployed as of the first quarter of 2014. Tunisia's political transition gained new momentum in early 2014, with the resolution of a political deadlock, the adoption of a new Constitution and the appointment of a new government. The national dialogue platform, brokered by key civil society organizations, played a crucial role in gathering all major political parties. This consensus will allow for further reform in the economy and public sector.

In 2015, the Bardo National Museum attack led to the collapse of the third largest sector of Tunisia's economy, tourism. Tunisian tourist workers in Tunis have said that "tourism is dead, it is completely dead" expressing the severe drop in tourism after the attack.

The number of ragpickers is increasing due to the continuing high level of unemployment (15% of the working population), the loss of purchasing power of the most disadvantaged families, and the explosion of plastic waste due to new consumption habits. They do not benefit from any social protection - medical coverage, retirement... - granted to professions with a legal status and may be subject to the exploitation of the recycling industry

The following table shows the main economic indicators in 1980–2017. Inflation under 5% is in green.

External trade and investment

In 1992, Tunisia re-entered the private international capital market for the first time in 6 years, securing a $10-million line of credit for balance-of-payments support. In January 2003 Standard & Poor's affirmed its investment grade credit ratings for Tunisia. The World Economic Forum 2002-03 ranked Tunisia 34th in the Global Competitiveness Index Ratings (two places behind South Africa, the continent's leader). In April 2002, Tunisia's first US dollar-denominated sovereign bond issue since 1997 raised $458 million, with maturity in 2012.

The Bourse de Tunis is under the control of the state-run Financial Market Council and lists over 50 companies. The government offers substantial tax incentives to encourage companies to join the exchange, and expansion is occurring.

The Tunisian government adopted a unified investment code in 1993 to attract foreign capital. More than 1,600 export-oriented joint venture firms operate in Tunisia to take advantage of relatively low labor costs and preferential access to nearby European markets. Economic links are closest with European countries, which dominate Tunisia's trade. Tunisia's currency, the dinar, is not traded outside Tunisia. However, partial convertibility exists for bona fide commercial and investment transaction. Certain restrictions still limit operations carried out by Tunisian residents.

The stock market capitalisation of listed companies in Tunisia was valued at $5.3 Billion in 2007, 15% of 2007 GDP, by the World Bank.

For 2007, foreign direct investment totaled TN Dinar 2 billion in 2007, or 5.18% of the total volume of investment in the country. This figure is up 35.7% from 2006 and includes 271 new foreign enterprises and the expansion of 222 others already based in the country.

The economic growth rate seen for 2007, at 6.3% is the highest achieved in a decade.

On 29 and 30 November, Tunisia held an investment conference with country chiefs from all around the world with pledges that have reached $30 billion to finance new public projects.

As of 2022, Tunisia's government is in need of international help as the economy grapples with a crisis in public finances that has raised fears it may default on debt and has contributed to shortages of food and fuel, according to government critics. As a result, the government announced in December 2022 that they expect to reduce its fiscal deficit to 5.5% in 2023 from a forecast 7.7% this year, driven by austerity measures that could pave the way for a final deal with the International Monetary Fund on a rescue package.

Loan Guarantee 
On 20 April 2012, U.S. Treasury Secretary and Tunisian Finance Minister Houcine Dimassi signed a declaration of intent to move forward on a U.S. loan guarantee for Tunisia. The U.S. Government would provide this loan guarantee to enable the Tunisian government to access significant market financing at affordable rates and favorable maturities with the backing of a U.S. guarantee of principal and interest (up to 100 percent).

The support would consist of the U.S. guarantee of Tunisian government-issued debt (or of bank loans made to the Government of Tunisia).  This guarantee will significantly reduce the Tunisian government's borrowing costs at a time when market access has become more expensive for many emerging market countries.  In the weeks ahead, both governments intend to make progress on a loan guarantee agreement that would allow Tunisia to move forward with a debt issuance.

The ceremony took place at the World Bank immediately following the meeting of Finance Ministers of the Deauville Partnership with Arab Countries in Transition.

Microfinance institutions, such as Enda Tamweel, exist to assist those who are unable to access the regular banking system. This comprises those living in rural or impoverished regions where the informal sector thrives, accounting for 34% of Tunisia's GDP.

Enda Tamweel has made over 3 million microloans to over 900,000 people in the 30 years since its inception, infusing more than €1.6 billion into the local economy.

Energy 

Tunisia's natural resources are modest when compared to those of its neighbors: Algeria and Libya. This modesty in natural resources forced the country to import oil, which contributed to the rise in the cost of gasoline: on April 26, 2006, the liter crossed the bar of one dinar to sell for 1.50 Tunisian dinars. (a price equivalent to European prices from the point of view of purchasing power parity).

Electricity 
 Production: 16.13 Billion kWh (2011)
 Production by source:
 fossil fuel: 96.8% (2010)
 hydro: 1.7% (2010)
 other: 1.5% (2010)
 Consumption: 13.29 billion kWh (2010)
 Exports: None (2010)
 Imports: 19 million kWh (2010)

Economic structure 
In 2017, the breakdown by economic sector is as follows:

Agriculture
Agriculture - products: olives, grain, tomatoes, citrus fruit, sugar beets, dates, almonds.

In 2018, Tunisia produced:

 1.5 million tons of wheat;
 1.3 million tons of tomato (16th largest producer in the world);
 825 thousand tons of olives (7th largest producer in the world);
 700 thousand tons of barley;
 548 thousand tons of watermelon;
 450 thousand tons of onion;
 426 thousand tons of pepper;
 423 thousand tons of potato;
 241 thousand tons of date (10th largest producer in the world);
 217 thousand tons of carrots;
 146 thousand tons of grape;
 144 thousand tons of orange;
 118 thousand tons of peach;
 114 thousand tons of apple;
 104 thousand tons of grapefruit;
 102 thousand tons of melon;

In addition to smaller productions of other agricultural products, like almond (66 thousand tons) and sugar beet (76 thousand tons).

See also
Economy of Africa
 List of companies based in Tunisia
 United Nations Economic Commission for: Africa & Western Asia

References

External links
 Historic Growth Trend of Tunisia's Economy, 1962 – 2007

 Economy of Tunisia extracted from the CIA factbook public data

 
Tunisia
Tunisia
Tunisia